There were 12 athletes on wheelchairs and 31 athletes on foot representing the country at the 2000 Summer Paralympics.

Medallists

See also
Argentina at the 2000 Summer Olympics
Argentina at the Paralympics

References

Bibliography

External links
International Paralympic Committee

Nations at the 2000 Summer Paralympics
Paralympics
2000